Ernest James Brinton (26 May 1908 – 17 September 1981) was an English footballer who played as a half back. He made over 330 Football League appearances in the years before and after the Second World War.

Career
Brinton played for Bristol City.

Honours
with Newport County
Football League Third Division South winner: 1938–39

References

1908 births
1981 deaths
English footballers
English Football League players
Newport County A.F.C. players
Aldershot F.C. players
Bristol City F.C. players
Street F.C. players
Footballers from Bristol
Association football midfielders
English football managers
Ilfracombe Town F.C. managers